{{Automatic taxobox
| image = 
| image_caption = 
| taxon = Millieriidae
| display_parents = 4
| authority = Stainton, 1854
| diversity_ref = 
| diversity = 3 genera and 4 species
| diversity_link = Lepidopteran diversity
| subdivision_ranks = Subfamilies and genera
| subdivision = 
Millieria Ragonot, 1874
Phormoestes Heppner, 1982
Nyx Heppner, 1982| synonyms = Millieridae
}}
Millieriidae is a small family of moths in the lepidopteran order. It was described as by Henry Tibbats Stainton in 1854 as a subfamily of Choreutidae.

References

  1982: Millieriinae, a new subfamily of Choreutidae, with new taxa from Chile and the United States (Lepidoptera: Sesioidea). Smithsonian Contributions to Zoology, (370)
 ;  2011: Note on taxonomic history, thoraco-abdominal articulation, and current placement of Millieriidae (Insecta: Lepidoptera). Zootaxa'', 3032: 65–68. Preview

External links

 
Moth families